Ardeotis is a genus of birds in the family Otididae. 

The genus was described in 1853 by the French naturalist Emmanuel Le Maout to accommodate the Arabian bustard.

It contains the following species:

References

 
Bird genera
Taxonomy articles created by Polbot